The Faith is the second solo album from Christian hip hop artist Da’ T.R.U.T.H., released on September 13, 2005.

Reception

Track listing

References 

2005 albums
Da' T.R.U.T.H. albums
Cross Movement Records albums
Albums produced by DJ Official